Werne an der Lippe (Westphalian: Wäen) is a town in the Federal state of North Rhine-Westphalia in the Unna district in Germany. It is located on the southern edge of the Münsterland region near the Ruhrgebiet. The population of Werne is about 32,000.

History

Middle Ages and early modern period

The first Bishop of Münster, Liudger established Werne as a parish by erecting a chapel in the southern parts of the Dreingau ("in pago dreginni"). He acted on orders of Charlemagne who, having finally brought the region under the fold of Francia following the conclusion of the Saxon Wars, was eager to press on with Christianization. The Latin text of the oldest preserved document ("in villa quae dicitur werina"), which dates from 834 and is being kept at the Leiden University Library, indicates that by this time a village had already formed around the chapel.

Traders and peasants continued to accrete throughout the next three centuries. At some point between the years 1192 and 1195, the regional bishopric established a customs agency at Werne and put the place under its direct jurisdiction. The year 1253 found Werne in an alliance (the "Werner Bund") with the cities of Münster, Dortmund, Soest and Lippstadt to defend transit and trading rights relating to a bridge over the Lippe river. In 1470 Werne became a member of the Hanseatic League. A town hall was built from 1512 to 1561.

The first moves towards a fortification of Werne date to 1302 when a trench was dug around the church; this was improved and extended to protect the entire settlement in 1383, two years before it received town privileges in 1385. After Adolph I, Duke of Cleves had burned Werne to the ground in 1400, the full fortification of the town commenced in 1415. However, this did not prevent occupation, looting and torching of the town on several occasions during the Thirty Years' War and of course it was no help at all against the Black Death, which killed 313 people (out of a population of about 1,000) in 1636 and 1637 while the war still raged. (Parts of the town wall and some of the towers were pulled down in 1779; the last town gate (the "Neutor") was demolished in 1843.)

The Peace of Westphalia, signed in 1648 at the nearby cities of Münster and Osnabrück, had essentially expelled Protestantism from the Werne region. From 1671 to 1673 the Order of Friars Minor Capuchin erected a monastery and, from 1677 to 1681, the Catholic Church. (The Martin Luther Church at the Wichernstraße dates from 1904).

From the Napoleonic time to industrialization
Werne, which had come under the administration of Prussia in 1803 when the Prince-Bishopric of Münster had been dissolved, was attached to the Grand Duchy of Berg by Napoleon in 1806. The Congress of Vienna restored the town to Prussia which incorporated it with other territories into its Province of Westphalia. In 1831 was granted a degree of administrative independence under the Prussian municipal code of 1831.

In 1873 and 1874 the search for coal produced a brine thermal spring, and the Werne Baths were established in 1878. The actual coal mine did not commence operations before 1899; it was operated until 1975. Today the buildings of the "Zeche Werne" have been converted to public meeting places, or are part of a business park.

The railway line Münster-Werne-Dortmund was opened in 1928. It had taken a significant amount of lobbying to get Werne a railway station, which was totally refurbished in 2005.

World War II
During the war, 471 citizens of Werne died and 500 more disappeared without trace. The town accommodated nearly 4,000 refugees.

Population
The population of the town of Werne (and the ward of Stockum) increased from 1974 to 2003 by about 23%. The proportion of foreigners was about five percent in 2003. In the same year, the ward of Stockum with 4,760 inhabitants presented 14.6% of the population of Werne. The proportion of the Catholic population amounted to 57.4%, the proportion of the Protestant population to 25.0%. 17.6% had no religious affiliation or belonged to another faith.

In 2012 Werne had a population of 29,482.

Education and culture

Schools
 Gymnasium St. Christophorus
 Anne-Frank-Gymnasium, municipal high school
 Freiherr-vom-Stein vocational school
 Konrad-Adenauer-Realschule
 Marga-Spiegel-Schule, comprehensive school since August 2012, named after Marga Spiegel, a holocaust survivor
 Schule am Windmühlenberg, municipal Hauptschule
 Barbaraschule – special school, named after Barbara von Nikomedien
 Kardinal-von-Galen school, catholic primary school
 Uhlandschule, catholic primary school
 Weihbachschule, undenominational primaryschool
 Wiehagenschule, catholic primary school (also open day school)
 Wienbredeschule, catholic primary school (also open day school)
 Familienbildungsstätte
 Folk high school Werne
 Town library

Stages
 Sylvan theatre Werne
 Kolpinghaus Werne

Museums
 Karl Pollender town museum

Notable people
Hans-Martin Linde (born 1930), classical flautist
Dietrich Schwanitz (1940–2004), writer and literature scientist
Theodor Homann (1948–2010), footballer
Gabriele Behler (born 1951), politician, former minister of North Rhine-Westphalia
Lars Müller (born 1976), footballer
Nikolas Katsigiannis (born 1982), handball player
Mehmet Kara (born 1983), footballer
Marvin Pourié (born 1991), footballer

Twin towns – sister cities

Werne is twinned with:
 Bailleul, France (1967)
 Lytham St Annes, England, United Kingdom (1984)
 Kyritz, Germany (1990)
 Wałcz, Poland (1992)
 Poggibonsi, Italy (2000)

References

External links
  
 International Club Werne
 Pictures and some information in english language about Werne on a German homepage

Unna (district)
Members of the Hanseatic League